The 1997–98 Irish Cup was the 118th edition of Northern Ireland's premier football knock-out cup competition. It concluded on 2 May 1998 with the final.

Glenavon were the defending champions after winning their 5th Irish Cup last season, with a 1–0 win over Cliftonville in the 1997 final. This season Glenavon reached the final again for the third year in a row, but were defeated 1–0 after extra time by Glentoran, who won the cup for the 17th time. This was a repeat of the 1995–96 final two years earlier that also ended 1–0 to the Glens.

Fifth round

|}

Replays

|}

Sixth round

|}

Replays

|}

Quarter-finals

|}

Semi-finals

|}

Final

References

1997–98
1997–98 domestic association football cups
1997–98 in Northern Ireland association football